The Olympus Academy Trust was set up in 2012. Situated within the districts of Bradley Stoke, Filton, Patchway and surrounding areas the trust currently comprises nine South Gloucestershire schools; one all-through, three secondary and five primary academies.

The trust is responsible and accountable for the education of in excess of 6400+ students between the ages of 4 and 19 and for the employment and support of over 800+ staff. The trust is a charitable company run on a non-profit basis.

History
In January 2013 the trust commenced sponsorship of Abbeywood Community School, a local secondary school placed in Special Measures. The school was subsequently judged to be 'GOOD' in all areas in a 2015 Ofsted inspection, and judged to have no change to their previous 'GOOD' rating in 2018.

In January 2015 Meadowbrook and Charborough Road primaries joined the trust, followed by Callicroft, Filton Hill, and Stoke Lodge primary schools in September 2016; Callicroft and Stoke Lodge having previously been overseen by the Cosmos Academy Trust. Bradley Stoke secondary became an all-through school with its own primary phase in September 2015.

Schools Joining the Partnership
Jan 2012 - Bradley Stoke Community School
Jan 2013 - Abbeywood Community School
Jan 2015 - Meadowbrook and Charborough Road Primary Schools
Sep 2016 - Stoke Lodge, Filton Hill and Callicroft Primary Schools
Sep 2017 - Patchway Community School
Feb 2018 - Winterbourne Academy

Origin
The name Olympus originates from the Olympus Concorde engine. This is significant because it was designed and produced locally.

Governance
The trust is governed by a Board of Trustees. The board is responsible for holding CEO Dave Baker to account. The board is made up of 15 people – a mixture of parents, community members and experts who are appointed based on their skills, insight and knowledge. They work on a voluntary basis.

Board of Trustees Profiles
Dave Baker  - Chief Executive Officer
Sarah Williams  - Chair of the Board of Trustees
Jenny Allen - Audit and Risk Committee
Diane Ault - Finance and Resources Committee
Paul Davies - Audit and Risk Committee
Mike Fry - Audit and Risk Committee
Adele Haysom - Finance and Resources Committee
Jack Lacey - Trust Improvement Committee
Isabel Marsden - Trust Improvement Committee
Ross Newman - Safeguarding Trustee
Sarah Phillips - Finance and Resources Committee
Laurence Pitt - Trust Improvement Committee
Paul Roberts - Remunerations and Nominations Committee
Kate Sheldon - Trust Improvement Committee
Tim Williams - Governor, Bradley Stoke Community School

Schools and Academies
The Olympus Academy Trust (OAT) is a partnership of schools, currently comprising nine South Gloucestershire schools; one all-through, three secondary and five primary academies.

All-through Schools:
 Bradley Stoke Community School

Primary Schools:
 Charborough Road Primary
 Callicroft Primary Academy (previously Callicroft Primary School)
 Filton Hill Primary
 Meadowbrook Primary School
 Stoke Lodge Primary School

Secondary Schools:
 Abbeywood Community School
 Patchway Community School (previously Patchway Community College)
 Winterbourne Academy (previously TRFWIA, as a part of the Ridings Federation)

Headteachers
Ben Dilley, Abbeywood Community School
Steve Moir, Bradley Stoke Community School
David Howe, Patchway Community School
Jason Beardmore, Winterbourne Academy
Lucy Lang, Callicroft Primary Academy
Matt Lankester, Charborough Road Primary
Ian Oake, Filton Hill Primary
Nicola Bailey, Meadowbrook Primary
Will Ferris, Stoke Lodge Primary

Key Team Members
Executive Leadership:
Dave Baker - Chief Executive Officer
Claire Banks - Director of Education
Julia Anwar - Head of Business Operations
Matt Wall - Head of HR
Sarah Gardner - Executive Assistant

School Improvement Team:
Susie Beresford Wylie - Director of SEND, Inclusion and Vulnerable Groups
Sarah Evans - Director of Training & Partnerships
Tom Hill - Director of Post 16, Assessment, Digital Learning and IT
Jen Wathan - Teaching and Learning Lead (Primary)

References

Organisations based in Gloucestershire
Educational organisations based in England